The Danville Dashers were a hockey team from Danville, Illinois, in the Federal Prospects Hockey League. The Dashers were named in honor of the original Danville Dashers. From 2011 to 2020, the team played their home games at David S. Palmer Arena, which was also home to the original Dashers that played in the Continental Hockey League from 1981 to 1986, but were voted out of the arena in 2021.

History
The new Dashers were announced as a Federal Hockey League (FHL) expansion team in June 2011 to begin play in the 2011–12 season. The team was owned by Barry Soskin, who also had owned several junior and professional teams in the region, and was led by head coach and general manager Scott Beneke. On April 10, 2012, the Dashers announced an affiliation agreement with the Central Hockey League's Bloomington Blaze.

On December 20, 2013, it was announced that the Dashers would play the Watertown Privateers in a neutral site game in Connellsville, Pennsylvania, on March 22, 2014. The goal of the game was to test local interest in hockey with the idea of an expansion team being awarded to Connellsville if successful. The next season, the league awarded an expansion team in nearby Belle Vernon, but it was quickly folded.

After three seasons as head coach and winning the league championship, Steve Harrison left the Dashers to become head coach of the Dallas Blackhawks of the North American Prospects Hockey League, a U18 youth league. Former captain Brent Clarke was hired to replace Harrison for the 2017–18 season. Clarke had previously won coach of the year while with the Watertown Wolves when they won the FHL championship. Clarke left after one season to be closer to his family and took the head coaching job with the 2018 expansion team, the Elmira Enforcers. Clarke was replaced by Paul MacLean, a coach that had most recently been in the Greater Ontario Junior Hockey League. MacLean was fired on December 19, 2018, after a 9–8 start. After a month with Dustin Henning acting as player-coach, the Dashers hired former CHL Indianapolis Ice head coach Rod Davidson on January 22, 2019, who stayed until the end of the season. The Dashers then hired another former Dashers' player Ray Tremblay as the head coach for the 2019–20 season.

In 2018, the FHL began calling itself the Federal Prospects Hockey League (FPHL) and fully rebranded before the 2019–20 season. The FPHL was then among the many leagues that had to prematurely end their seasons in 2020 due to the COVID-19 pandemic. During the shutdown, the Palmer Arena's operators looked to terminate the Dashers' contract with the venue, but the arena's board upheld the contract in the Dashers' favor. Subsequently, the Dashers were one of several FPHL teams that did not immediately return to play in the delayed 2020–21 season when it commenced in February 2021. On March 9, 2021, the arena again held a meeting to determine whether to keep the Dashers as a tenant or give a contract to a new team, ultimately deciding to go forward with a new team called the Vermilion County Bobcats in the Southern Professional Hockey League. The Dashers' management stated they might pursue relocation or other forms of keeping the team active, but the Dashers will not be returning to Palmer Arena.

Season-by-season record

References

External links
Danville Dashers website
Federal Prospects Hockey League website

Federal Prospects Hockey League teams
Ice hockey teams in Illinois
Dashers FHL
Ice hockey clubs established in 2011
2011 establishments in Illinois